Elmo Fernando (died 11 August 2016) was a popular announcer with Radio Ceylon and subsequently the Ceylon Broadcasting Corporation. Fernando was an excellent reader of the news. He joined Radio Ceylon, the oldest radio station in South Asia at a time when it was known as the 'King of the Airwaves' in the 1950s and 1960s. Millions tuned into the station from across the Indian sub-continent. When he was at Radio Ceylon he was mentored by the veteran broadcaster Vernon Corea.

Fernando left the Sri Lanka Broadcasting Corporation in the 1970s and joined an overseas Catholic radio station. He was a Colombo Correspondent of the BBC.

See also 
Radio Ceylon
Sri Lanka Broadcasting Corporation
List of Sri Lankan Broadcasters

References 

"'එල්මෝ ප්‍රනාන්දු කොළඹ සිට' එළිදැක්වෙයි" - http://www.bbc.com/sinhala/world-39936695

Bibliography 
 Wavell, Stuart. - The Art of Radio - Training Manual written by the Director Training of the CBC. - Ceylon Broadcasting Corporation, 1969.

External links 
 Sri Lanka Broadcasting Corporation
 SLBC-creating new waves of history
Eighty Years of Broadcasting in Sri Lanka

Sri Lankan radio journalists
Sinhalese people
British people of Sri Lankan descent
2016 deaths
Year of birth missing